Te Kowhai Aerodrome  is a privately owned airfield located near the township of Te Kowhai in the Waikato region of New Zealand. It was the home of the microlight aircraft manufacturer Micro Aviation NZ until the death of the company's founder, Max Clear, in 2011.

The airfield was sold by the Clear family in August 2016 to an operating and development company called TK Airfield Land Ltd.

References

Sources
 New Zealand AIP 4 AD
New Zealand AIP (PDF)
NZTE Operations Ltd. Website
AIP Supplement 8-Dec-2016

Airports in New Zealand
Transport buildings and structures in Waikato
Privately owned airports